KLST (channel 8) is a television station in San Angelo, Texas, United States, affiliated with CBS. It is owned by Nexstar Media Group, which provides certain services to NBC affiliate KSAN-TV (channel 3) under joint sales and shared services agreements (JSA/SSA) with Mission Broadcasting. The two stations share studios on Armstrong Street in San Angelo; KLST's transmitter is located near Eola, Texas.

History
Channel 8 was the first television station in San Angelo, signing on the air on July 6, 1953, as KTXL-TV (co-owned with KTXL (1340 AM)); the station was originally founded and owned by Armistead D. Rust (then the mayor of San Angelo) and B. P. Bludworth. In 1957, the station changed its call sign to KCTV.

KCTV changed ownership three times between 1959 and 1971: first, it was sold to Big Spring Broadcasting in 1959, and then Westex Television in 1962, and then the Jewell Television Corporation in 1971.

In 1983, the station changed its call letters again to become KLST. The change had been induced by channel 5 in Kansas City, Missouri, which needed to change its call sign and was interested in becoming KCTV; the Missouri station paid all of channel 8's name change expenses.

KLST was purchased by Nexstar Broadcasting in 2004 from the Jewell Television Corporation. Nexstar was already operating KSAN-TV under joint sales and shared services agreements.

News operation
KLST presently broadcasts 19 hours of locally produced newscasts each week (with 3½ hours each weekday, one hour on Saturdays and switches between a half-hour and one hour on Sundays during sports seasons).

Subchannels
The station's digital signal is multiplexed:

On June 15, 2016, Nexstar announced that it has entered into an affiliation agreement with Katz Broadcasting for the Escape (now Ion Mystery), Laff, Grit, and Bounce TV networks (the last one of which is owned by Bounce Media LLC, whose COO Jonathan Katz is president/CEO of Katz Broadcasting), bringing the four networks to 81 stations owned and/or operated by Nexstar, including KLST and KSAN-TV.

Coverage area
KLST serves as the CBS affiliate for 11 counties in West Central Texas that form the San Angelo television market as defined by Nielsen (Tom Green, Sterling, Coke, Irion, Concho, McCulloch, Schleicher, Menard, Crockett, Sutton, and Kimble).

KLST also provides news and weather coverage to four other counties that assigned to other nearby television markets (Runnels and Coleman in the Abilene–Sweetwater DMA, Reagan in the Midland–Odessa DMA, and Mason in the Austin DMA). Runnels County is immediately adjacent to Tom Green County (where San Angelo is located), but the majority of the residents in the county watch local television stations that broadcast from Abilene, so the county is assigned to the Abilene–Sweetwater television market by Nielsen.

References

External links

LST
CBS network affiliates
Television channels and stations established in 1953
1953 establishments in Texas
Nexstar Media Group